Reilhac may refer to the following places in France:

 Reilhac, Cantal, a commune in the Cantal department
 Reilhac, Lot, a commune in the Lot department